1879 in sports describes the year's events in world sport.

Athletics
USA Outdoor Track and Field Championships

American football
College championship
 College football national championship – Princeton Tigers
Events
 Foundation of Michigan Wolverines

Association football
International
 5 April — James F. M. Prinsep of Clapham Rovers becomes England's youngest international player at the age of 17 years and 252 when he makes his debut (and only appearance) for England against Scotland.  The record stands for more than 123 years until broken by Wayne Rooney in 2003.
England
 FA Cup final – Old Etonians 1–0 Clapham Rovers at The Oval
 Sunderland AFC is founded by a meeting of local schoolteachers and originally called Sunderland & District Teachers AFC.  Non–teachers are allowed to play the following year when the club's name is changed to Sunderland AFC.
Scotland
 Scottish Cup final – Vale of Leven win by a walkover after Rangers refuse to appear in the replay due to a protest about a disallowed goal in the original match, drawn 1–1.

Baseball
National championship
 National League champions – Providence Grays
Events
 The National League agrees that no one else will hire any of five players listed by each club, the first reserve lists.

Boxing
Events
 John J. Dwyer defeats former champion Jimmy Elliott in 12 rounds at Long Point, Canada, and then claims the Heavyweight Championship of America due to the continued inactivity of current champion Joe Goss and the main challenger Paddy Ryan.  His claim is not recognised.  Subsequently, Dwyer becomes involved in a bar room brawl with Ryan in New York City.
 John L. Sullivan turns professional and wins his first five known fights.

Cricket
Events
 2–4 January — Australia defeats England by 10 wickets at Sydney Cricket Ground in the only Test match of the season
 2 January — Fred Spofforth of Australia claims the first hat-trick in Test cricket
 25 February — formation of Leicestershire County Cricket Club
England
 Champion County –  Lancashire and Nottinghamshire share the title
 Most runs – W. G. Grace 880 @ 35.20 (HS 123)
 Most wickets – Fred Morley 147 @ 10.70 (BB 8–52)
Australia
 Most runs – George Ulyett 306 @ 34.00 (HS 71)
 Most wickets – Tom Emmett 44 @ 11.63 (BB 8–47)

Golf
Major tournaments
 British Open – Jamie Anderson

Horse racing
England
 Grand National – The Liberator
 1,000 Guineas Stakes – Wheel of Fortune
 2,000 Guineas Stakes – Charibert
 The Derby – Sir Bevys
 The Oaks – Wheel of Fortune
 St. Leger Stakes – Rayon d'Or
Australia
 Melbourne Cup – Darriwell
Canada
 Queen's Plate – Moss Rose
Ireland
 Irish Grand National – Jupiter Tonans
 Irish Derby Stakes – Soulouque 
USA
 Kentucky Derby – Lord Murphy
 Preakness Stakes – Harold
 Belmont Stakes – Spendthrift

Hurling
Events
 The Irish Hurling Union formalises the sport for the first time.

Lacrosse
Events
 The U.S. Amateur Lacrosse Association is formed and adopts the Canadian rules.

Rowing
The Boat Race
 5 April — Cambridge wins the 36th Oxford and Cambridge Boat Race

Rugby football
Events
 Foundation of Bramley, Rosslyn Park F.C. and Warrington

Tennis
England
 Wimbledon Men's Singles Championship – John Hartley (GB) defeated Vere St. Leger Goold (GB) 6–2, 6–4, 6–2

World
The 3rd pre-open era 1879 Men's Tennis tour gets underway 12 tournaments are staged this year between 2 June – 28 December 1879.

References

 
Sports by year